John Erickson may refer to:

 John E. Erickson (Montana politician) (1863–1946), American politician from Montana
 John E. Erickson (basketball) (1927–2020), American basketball coach and executive, Wisconsin politician  
 John P. Erickson (1826–1907), American Civil War sailor and Medal of Honor recipient
 John Erickson (golfer) (born 1964), American golfer
 John Erickson (historian) (1929–2002), British historian and defence expert
 John R. Erickson (born 1942), author of the Hank the Cowdog book series
 John C. Erickson, founder of Erickson Retirement Communities
 John H. Erickson, dean of Saint Vladimir's Orthodox Theological Seminary in the United States
 John Erickson (Oregon politician), former Oregon Superintendent of Public Instruction

See also 
 Jon Erickson (disambiguation)
 John Ericson (born 1926), German-American actor
 John Ericsson (1803–1889), inventor
 John Eriksen (1957–2002), Danish footballer
 John Eriksson (footballer) (1929–2020), Swedish footballer
 John Eriksson (mycologist) (1921–1995), Swedish mycologist
 John Eriksson (musician) (born 1974), Swedish musician, member of Peter Bjorn and John
 John Eriksson i Bäckmora (1915–1974), Swedish politician
 Jon Erikson (1955–2014), American swimmer